Raja Isa bin Raja Akram Shah, better known as Raja Isa (born 1 February 1966) is a Malaysian football head coach. He is well known in Indonesia, where has coached several teams in top divisions. Recently he joined Bangladesh Football Premier League team Muktijoddha Sangsad KC as a head coach

Career

As a coach
Raja Isa started coaching for Selangor FA youth teams, but was brought to Indonesia as part of Irfan Bakti coaching staff at Persipura Jayapura in 2007. Raja Isa and Irfan had worked together before at Melaka TMFC, as assistant head coach and head coach respectively. When Irfan returned to Malaysia later that year to coach Perlis FA, Raja Isa was promoted to the head coach position. He guided Persipura to the 2007 Copa Indonesia Final, where his team was beaten 3-0 on penalties to Sriwijaya FC after 1-1 on normal regulation time.

In 2008, after he was released by Persipura, Raja Isa was appointed as the head coach of PSM Makassar. Early in 2009, Raja Isa was appointed at another club in Indonesia, Persiram Raja Ampat. He also had a stint in PSMS Medan from 2011 to 2012.

In April 2013, he was named as new head coach of Persijap Jepara. He holds this position until his contract was terminated in May 2014.

External links
 Raja Isa : Jurulatih Kelab Bola Sepak Indonesia dari Malaysia

References

1966 births
Malaysian football managers
Malaysian expatriate football managers
Living people
PSM Makassar managers
Bangladesh Football Premier League managers